The 2003–04 Vyshcha Liha season was the 13th since its establishment. The season began on 12 July 2003 with seven games of the first season round. FC Dynamo Kyiv were the defending champions, having won their 11th league title in the 2002–03 season and they successfully defended their title by winning the championship in the last round of the competition.

A total of sixteen teams participated in the league, the best fourteen sides of the 2002–03 season and two promoted clubs from the 2002–03 Ukrainian First League.

The competition had a winter break which began on 11 November 2003 and the season resumed on 14 March 2004. The season concluded on 19 June 2004.

Teams

Promotions
Zirka Kirovohrad, the winners of the 2002–03 Ukrainian First League  – (returning after absence of 3 seasons)
Borysfen Boryspil, the runners-up of the 2002–03 Ukrainian First League  – (debut)

Renamed
 Vorskla Poltava changed its name to FC Vorskla-Naftohaz Poltava before the start of the season.
 On February 10–17, 2004 Metalurh Zaporizhya carried the name of FC Metalurh-Zaporizhya Zaporizhya.

Location

League table

Results

Top goal scorers

References

External links
ukrsoccerhistory.com - source of information

Ukrainian Premier League seasons
1
Ukra